Lloyd is an unincorporated community located in Greenup County, Kentucky, United States. Lloyd appears on the Greenup and Wheelersburg USGS maps.

Greenup County High School, Greysbranch Elementary School, the Greenup County Schools central office and the Greenup Lock and Dam/Jesse Stuart Memorial Bridge on the Ohio River are located in Lloyd.

References

Unincorporated communities in Kentucky
Unincorporated communities in Greenup County, Kentucky
Kentucky populated places on the Ohio River